Club de Fútbol Diablos Azules de Guasave is a Mexican football club that plays in the Tercera División de México. The club is based in Atlacomulco, State of Mexico and was founded in 1991.

See also
Football in Mexico
Tercera División de México

External links
Tercera Divicion

References 

Association football clubs established in 1985
Football clubs in Sinaloa
1985 establishments in Mexico
Sport in Guasave